Mario Ančić was the defending champion and successfully defended his title.
Mario Ančić defeated Jan Hernych 6–0, 5–7, 7–5  to win the 2006 Ordina Open singles event.

Seeds

Draws

Finals

Section 1

Section 2

External links
Singles Draw
Singles Qualifying Draw

Ordina Open - Men's Singles
Rosmalen Grass Court Championships